Patrick Minor Martin (November 25, 1924 – July 18, 1968) was an American lawyer and World War II veteran who served one term as a U.S. Representative from California from 1963 to 1965.

Early life and education 
Martin was born in Norfolk, Nebraska.  Originally named Minor Carl Martin, he was known as "Pat", and in 1963 he had his name legally changed to Patrick Minor Martin.  He was raised in Nebraska and California. He graduated from Riverside Junior College in 1947, the University of California at Berkeley in 1949, and the Hastings College of Law in 1953. He was admitted to the bar and began the practice of law in Riverside, California.

World War II
Martin was a veteran of World War II, having served as a radioman in the United States Coast Guard from 1943 to 1945.

Congress 
Martin was elected as a Republican to the Eighty-eighth Congress (January 3, 1963 – January 3, 1965).

Later career and death 
He was an unsuccessful candidate for reelection in 1964 to the Eighty-ninth Congress, after which he resumed the practice of law.

Martin was diagnosed with melanoma, and died in Long Beach, California on July 18, 1968.  He was buried at Arlington National Cemetery, Section 13, Grave 14684-F.

References

External links

1924 births
1968 deaths
Lawyers from Riverside, California
University of California, Berkeley alumni
University of California, Hastings College of the Law alumni
United States Coast Guard enlisted
Burials at Arlington National Cemetery
Republican Party members of the United States House of Representatives from California
20th-century American politicians
People from Norfolk, Nebraska
20th-century American lawyers
United States Coast Guard personnel of World War II
Deaths from melanoma
Deaths from cancer in California